Manamadurai is the 187th state assembly constituency in Tamil Nadu. It is a Scheduled Caste reserved constituency located in Sivaganga district. It is a component of Sivaganga Lok sabha constituency. From 2008 onwards Ilayangudi Assembly constituency had been merged with Manamadurai constituency under constituency delimitation act. It is one of the 234 State Legislative Assembly Constituencies in Tamil Nadu, in India.

Some of the Major demands of people in Manamadurai constituency are to construct new Bus Stands at Thiruppuvanam and Suranam and also to Upgrade the Bus stands present in Manamadurai, ilayangudi and salaigramam; to bring an Agro Based Industry related with Capsicum Plantation near Ilayangudi as these areas have more capsicum plantation. Revival of SIPCOT at Manamadurai and SIDCO at Kirungakottai near Manamadurai; to upgrade Village roads to Highway Roads which are present inbetween Manamadurai to Naraikudi via Annavasal and Maraiyur and Salaigramam to Devakottai via Suranam, Sarukani. Manamadurai constituency consist of 3 Taluks namely Manamadurai Taluk, Ilayangudi Taluk and Thiruppuvanam Taluk.

Elections and winners in the constituency are listed below.

Madras State

Tamil Nadu

Election Results

2021

2019 By-election

2016

2011

2006

2001

1996

1991

1989

1984

1980

1977

1971

1967

1962

1957

1952

References 

 

Assembly constituencies of Tamil Nadu
Sivaganga district